Chandil Dam was built across the Subarnarekha, in Bihar (later Jharkhand), as a part of the Subarnarekha Multipurpose Project.

Geography

Location 
It is in Chandil block in Seraikela Kharsawan district of Jharkhand state, India.

Area overview 
The area shown in the map has been described as “part of the southern fringe of the Chotanagpur plateau and is a hilly upland tract”. 75.7% of the population lives in the rural areas and 24.3% lives in the urban areas. 

Note: The map alongside presents some of the notable locations in the district. All places marked in the map are linked in the larger full screen map.

Subarnarekha Multipurpose Project 
Subarnarekha Multipurpose Project, jointly sponsored by the governments of Bihar (later Jharkhand), Odisha and West Bengal, supported by a joint agreement signed in 1978. The main components of the project were Chandil Dam and Galudih Barrage across the Subarnarekha, Icha Dam and Kharkhai Barrage across the Kharkai, and associated canal network.

The project 

Tourism 
Seraikela Kharsawan district administration claims, “This dam is one of the most visited places of Jharkhand.” With the scenic Dalma Hills towering in the background, it is a major tourist Centre. In a museum nearby, 2,000 year old scripts on rock are on display.

References 
 

 

 

Dams in Jharkhand